A nominal fee refers to a sale of a good or service for far less than it is actually worth, when it cannot be given away for free. Typically, such a sale will be for the smallest full denomination of a currency (for example, one dollar). Nominal fees are necessary when contracts are signed, since in order for a contract to be valid, some form of payment must be involved.

Examples 
In 2006, the Quebec North Shore and Labrador Railway sold a 135 mile long rail line to Tshiuetin Rail Transportation for $1. Tshiuetin was formed by several First Nations communities to continue railroad service on the line, which formerly was used for transporting minerals.

See also 

 Peppercorn (legal) Similar concept, specific to United Kingdom law

References 

Payment terms
Costs